Hans Brandenberger (28 June 1912 – 26 March 2003) was a Swiss sculptor, and medallist. His work was part of the sculpture event in the art competition at the 1948 Summer Olympics.

References

1912 births
2003 deaths
20th-century Swiss sculptors
Swiss sculptors
Olympic competitors in art competitions
20th-century Swiss male artists